Princess Adelaide of Löwenstein-Wertheim-Rosenberg (3 April 1831 – 16 December 1909) was the wife of Miguel de Bragança, the former occupant of the Portuguese throne but only following his deposition. As a widow, she secured advantageous marriages for their six daughters.

Family

Princess Adelaide Sofia Amelia of Löwenstein-Wertheim-Rosenberg was born in Kleinheubach, near Miltenberg, Bavaria, on 3 April 1831, Easter Sunday. She was a daughter of Constantine, Hereditary Prince of Löwenstein-Wertheim-Rosenberg (1802–1838), and Princess Agnes of Hohenlohe-Langenburg. Adelaide was four and a half years old when her mother died and seven when she also lost her father. Adelaide and her brother, Charles, were brought up by their paternal grandparents, Charles Thomas, Prince of Löwenstein-Wertheim-Rosenberg (1783–1849) and his wife Princess Sophie Luise of Windisch-Graetz (1784-1848). Her maternal grandparents were Karl Ludwig, Prince of Hohenlohe-Langenburg and Countess Amalie Henriette of Solms-Baruth.

Princess Adelaide belonged to the House of Löwenstein-Wertheim-Rosenberg, an originally morganatic branch of the House of Wittelsbach that was eventually elevated to princely status and then mediatised in 1819.

Marriage

On 24 September 1851, Adelaide married Miguel de Bragança, the former occupant of the Portuguese throne. The bride was 20 years old while the groom was almost 49.

Miguel had at first served as Regent in Portugal for his niece and betrothed Queen Maria II of Portugal but had seized the throne for himself on 23 June 1828. He was an avid conservative and admirer of Klemens Wenzel von Metternich. He overturned the Constitutional Charter written by his brother, Pedro I of Brazil, and tried to rule as an absolute monarch. This resulted in the so-called Liberal Wars (1828–1834), a prolonged civil war between progressive constitutionalists and authoritarian absolutists.

The war ended in 1834 with the deposition of Miguel.  He renounced all claims to the throne of Portugal in exchange for an annual pension. (Since he reneged on the terms of his deposition, he never collected the pension.) He was forced into a lifelong exile. He remained the senior male member of the Portuguese line of the House of Braganza.  However, he was never restored to the throne and it is disputed whether his descendants' dynastic rights were restored. On 15 January 1837, his support of Infante Carlos, Count of Molina, the first Carlist pretender to the Spanish throne, resulted in the removal of his rights to the said throne.

Children

Ancestry

Matchmaker and later life

Her husband, Miguel, died on 14 November 1866 before any of their children had reached adulthood. Adelaide, who was a very ambitious woman, would spend the next several decades attempting to secure prominent marriages for her children.

As a result of her largely successful attempts, her grandchildren would include (among others) Duarte Nuno, Duke of Braganza, Elisabeth Amalia, Princess of Liechtenstein, Elisabeth, Queen of the Belgians, Marie Gabrielle, Crown Princess of Bavaria, Marie-Adélaïde, Grand Duchess of Luxembourg, Charlotte, Grand Duchess of Luxembourg, Antoinette, Crown Princess of Bavaria, Xavier, Duke of Parma, Zita, Empress of Austria, Felix of Bourbon-Parma and Infanta Maria Adelaide of Portugal.  Many of her descendants have inherited her longevity.

In 1895, two years after the marriage of her last daughter, Adelaide, a devout Catholic, retired to the abbey of Sainte-Cécile de Solesmes in north-western France. She professed as a nun there on 12 June 1897. The community later moved to Cowes and then to Ryde on the Isle of Wight, where Adelhaid died on 16 December 1909 at the age of 78. In 1967 both her body and that of her husband were moved to the Braganza mausoleum in the Monastery of São Vicente de Fora in Lisbon. During her life, she lived during the reign of 6 Portuguese kings: her future husband Miguel I until 1834; her niece Maria II until 1853 (from 1837 along with her consort Fernando II); her grandnephews Pedro V until 1861 and Luís I  until 1889; her great-grandnephew Carlos I until 1908 and her great-great-grandnephew Manuel II from 1908.

Sources

"The Book of Kings: A Royal Genealogy" by C. Arnold McNaughton.
"Burke's Royal Families of the World", edited by Hugh Montgomery-Massingberd.

External links

1831 births
1909 deaths
People from Kleinheubach
House of Löwenstein-Wertheim-Rosenberg
Princesses of Löwenstein-Wertheim-Rosenberg
Burials at the Monastery of São Vicente de Fora
19th-century Portuguese women
19th-century German women
Royal reburials